A Rose without a Thorn is a 1958 Australian television play about King Henry VIII's marriage to Catherine Howard. It was directed by Alan Burke from a play by Clifford Bax. The play was shown live in Sydney, recorded, then shown in Melbourne.

Premise
The courtship and marriage of King Henry VIII and Catherine Howard.

Cast
Kevin Brennan as Henry VIII
Margaret Wolfit as Anne of Cleves
Elisabeth Waterhouse as Mary Lascelles
Moray Powell as Thomas Cranmer
Margo Lee as Catherine Howard
Charles Tasman as Audley
Jerome White as Thomas Culpepper
John Huson as Earl of Hertford

Production

A Rose Without a Thorn had been performed in 1933. It was adapted for Australian radio by Max Afford in 1940, a production much revived. It was also filmed by British TV in 1948.

It was the first production directed by Alan Burke after he joined the ABC full-time. Burke would go on to be one of the leading directors of the early days of Australian television. Seven different sets were used in the program.

It was broadcast in a series of "live" dramas on Sunday night on ABV-2 Melbourne. In order, they were The Governess, The Last Call, The Rose without a Thorn, The Lark, Citizen of Westminster, and Enemy of the People (the last of "the season").

See also
List of live television plays broadcast on Australian Broadcasting Corporation (1950s)

References

External links
 

1950s Australian television plays
1958 television plays
Films directed by Alan Burke (director)